Lee Bo-geun (born April 30, 1986) is a South Korean professional baseball pitcher currently playing for the Kiwoom Heroes of the KBO League.

References

External links
Career statistics and player information from Korea Baseball Organization

Lee Bo-geun at Nexen Heroes Baseball Club 

Kiwoom Heroes players
KBO League pitchers
South Korean baseball players
Hyundai Unicorns players
Seoul High School alumni
Baseball players from Seoul
South Korean Buddhists
1986 births
Living people